Iorwerth is a Welsh name, composed of two elements: iôr meaning "lord" and berth meaning "fair", "fine", or "handsome". (Both morphemes are somewhat archaic in Modern Welsh.) The name has historically been associated with the name Edward, although the names do not have a common origin and neither name is a translation of the other.

Bearers of the name include:
Iorwerth Beli (fl. second half of the 14th century), Welsh language poet
Iorwerth ap Bleddyn (1053–1111), prince of Powys in eastern Wales
Iorwerth Drwyndwn (1145–1174), son of Owain Gwynedd, king of Gwynedd
Iorwerth (bishop of St David's) (fl. 1215)
Thomas Iorwerth Ellis OBE (1899–1970), Welsh classicist and author
Iorwerth Evans (1906–1985), rugby union footballer of the 1930s
Iorwerth Hirflawdd, ancestor of various medieval rulers in mid Wales
Llywelyn ap Iorwerth (1172–1240), Llywelyn the Great, de facto ruler over most of Wales
Iorwerth Isaac (1911–1966), Welsh dual-code international rugby flanker
Iorwerth Jones (1903–1983), Welsh rugby union and professional rugby league footballer
Iorwerth Peate (1901–1982), Welsh poet and scholar
Iorwerth Thomas (1895–1966), Welsh Labour Party politician
Rhun ap Iorwerth, Plaid Cymru Member of the Senedd for Ynys Môn

See also
Iolo
Iori (disambiguation)

References

Welsh masculine given names